Beledweyne is a city in central Somalia. Beledweyne District is the capital city of the Hiran region.

The city is situated in the Shebelle Valley riverine near the Ethiopian border, 210 miles (345 km) north of Mogadishu. Beledweyne is divided by the Shebelle River into eastern and western sections. In 2019, Safiya Jimale became the first female mayor in Somalia.

History
There were battles in 2006, 2008, 2010 and 2011. In December 2011, the Transitional Federal Government took control of Beledweyne from jihadist group al-Shabaab. Somali National Army (SNA) soldiers and around 3,000 allied Ethiopian Army troops descended on the city, capturing it following several hours of fighting. In October 2013, additional SNA and AMISOM troops were deployed to the town to firm up on security after al-Shabaab claimed responsibility for a suicide bomb attack at a local cafeteria.

In 2009, an al-Shabaab suicide car bomber killed 57 people at a hotel. In 2013, they killed 16 people at a restaurant in October and 19 people at a police station in November. In February 2022, an al-Shabaab suicide bomber killed 14 people at a restaurant. In March 2022, they killed over 50 people in a series of attacks.

Municipality
On May 7, 2012, Beledweyne held its first mayoral elections since the start of the civil war in the early 1990s. Two hundred delegates took part in the contest, which was overseen by the Hiran region's head of elections, Sadaq Omar Sabriye. Mohamed Hassan Nuriye emerged as the new city mayor, obtaining 135 votes versus 11 and 8 votes, respectively, for the two nearest competitors.

In his first day in office, Mayor Nuriye officially banned firearms within the city limits. He also warned that people found contravening the edict would have their weapons impounded and could face imprisonment. In addition, Nuriye indicated that for security reasons, government soldiers who were not on patrol should remain within their bases. Soldiers would likewise only be permitted to carry weapons in the city while conducting security operations.

To further tighten up on security, Beledweyne municipality over a three-day period started simultaneously registering all local residents. Mayor Nuriye also unveiled plans for a citywide beautification campaign. In July 2012, his administration imposed a two-day night-time curfew in Beledweyne, while government soldiers demolished structures that had been illegally erected along the area's main road in one of the Municipality's first urban renewal initiatives.

In March 2015, the Beledweyne municipality launched a civilian tax collection program in the city. The tax revenue is earmarked for essential public social services. Additionally, the city government is slated to register all local businesses, which will further facilitate tax gathering. The municipal authorities are also scheduled to set up a new citywide house numbering system.

Transportation
Beledweyne is served by Beledweyne Airport. As of February 2015, the Djibouti Defense Forces have refurbished the airstrip.

Demographics
The district has a total population of 329,811 with 79/21 percent rural/urban divide.

Climate
Beledweyne has a hot arid climate (Köppen climate classification BWh).

Notable residents
 Aden Abdullah Osman Daar, first President of Somalia
 Omar Hashi Aen National Security Minister

Notes

References
Beledweyne, Somalia

 
Populated places in Hiran, Somalia